Un Segundo MTV unplugged ist the third live album by Mexican rock band Cafe Tacvba, released on October 22, 2019, through Universal Music Mexico. It was recorded on March 5, 2019, at the Sala Nezahualcóyotl of the National Autonomous University of Mexico (UNAM) and features production from Gustavo Santaolalla and Aníbal Kerpel, and musical guests such as David Byrne and Monsieur Periné's Catalina García.

The album is the band's second album for the MTV series MTV Unplugged, after their 2005 live album, this makes them the first Latinamerican band with more than one live album in the series.

At the 22nd Annual Latin Grammy Awards, the album received nominations for Best Alternative Music Album and Best Long Form Music Video.

Track listing
All tracks were produced by Gustavo Santaolalla and Aníbal Kerpel, and written by Café Tacuba (Emmanuel Del Real, Enrique Rangel, Rubén Albarrán, Joselo Rangel), except when noted.

References

2019 live albums
Café Tacuba live albums
Albums produced by Gustavo Santaolalla